Jo Kwang-min (born 24 April 1995) is a South Korean actor, model and singer, rapper. He is a member of Boyfriend.

Biography and career
He was born on 24 April 1995 in Seoul. He is the younger twin brother of Jo Youngmin. He and his older brother Jo Young-min trained under JYP Entertainment for two years. They started modeling since they were children and started appearing in various commercials. By their 100th day mark of being child actors, the twins had appeared in over 300 commercials. He also started to appear in various dramas and movies.

Discography

Filmography

Television

Film

References

External links 
 
 

1995 births
Living people
21st-century South Korean male actors
South Korean male models
South Korean male television actors
South Korean male film actors
South Korean male idols
South Korean male singers
South Korean male rappers
South Korean pop singers
South Korean hip hop record producers